Tadeusz Jasiński (1926 – 21 September 1939, in Grodno) - was one of the young defenders of Grodno (see Battle of Grodno (1939)) in September 1939, after the Soviet invasion of Poland. He was one of the civilians captured and used by the Soviets as "human shields" attached to the armor and tanks. 

On 14 September 2009 he was posthumously awarded the Commander's Cross of the Order of Polonia Restituta by the President of Poland, for heroism shown during the defense of Grodno in 1939.

Notes

1926 births
1939 deaths
Commanders of the Order of Polonia Restituta